Sporting Clube de Espinho has a professional handball team based in Espinho,  Portugal. It plays in LPA.

Portuguese handball clubs